Ronnie Scott's Live Session is the second extended play released by Australian singer–songwriter Gabriella Cilmi. It was recorded in 2008 at Ronnie Scott's Jazz Club and contains five songs from Cilmi's debut album Lessons to Be Learned, released earlier that year. The EP was released exclusively in Ireland on 5 May 2008 as a digital download.

Track listing

See also 
 Gabriella Cilmi discography
 Lessons to Be Learned

References

External links 
 Ronnie Scott's Live Session at the iTunes
 Ronnie Scott's Live Session at the Allmusic.com

2008 EPs
Gabriella Cilmi albums
Universal Records EPs